Edwin James Nairn Carr  (10 August 1926 – 27 March 2003) was a composer of classical music from New Zealand.

Biography
Edwin Carr was born in Auckland and was educated at Otago Boys' High School from 1940 to 1943. He studied music at Otago University from 1944–5 and Auckland University College from 1946, then left with his degree unfinished. In 1946 he attended the first Cambridge Summer Music School with Douglas Lilburn as his composition tutor. In 1948 he travelled to England on a New Zealand Government Bursary, to study composition at the Guildhall with Benjamin Frankel. During this time he did much freelance work, travelled widely and met Geoffrey Grey.

In 1954 a British Council scholarship enabled him to study under Petrassi in Rome. He also worked in Italy as the musical director of an independent ballet company. In 1957 a further British Council scholarship enabled him to study with Carl Orff in Munich. In 1958 he returned to New Zealand, staying there until 1960 teaching and composing.

During the 1960s he spent time in both Australia and England, composing, teaching and studying as well as several trips to New Zealand.

In 1973–74 he was awarded the Mozart Fellowship at the University of Otago. From 1975–76 he taught composition at the Sydney Conservatorium of Music before returning to London in 1976. He returned to Australia in 1977 and taught part-time at the Sydney Conservatorium. In 1984 he returned to Taupo, New Zealand where he composed and conducted freelance.

From 1991, Carr lived on Waiheke Island where he was still active as a composer. In the 1999 Queen's Birthday Honours, he was appointed a Member of the New Zealand Order of Merit, for services to music. Edwin Carr died at his home on Waiheke Island on 27 March 2003.

Works

Music works

1950 Mardi Gras Overture 
1951 A Blake Cantata 
1953 Suite No. 1 for two pianos (Cacciati dal Paradiso) 
1954 String Quartet No. 1 
1955 Piano Sonata No. 1 
1955 Electra – Ballet 
1958 Organ Sonata 
1958 Night Music – Scherzo 
1962 Piano Concerto No. 1 
1963 The Snowmaiden 
1963 Two Dances for viola and piano 
1965 Four pieces for Oboe d'amore and piano (dedicated to Jennifer Paull)
1966 Edith Sitwell Song cycle for oboe, soprano and piano 
1966 Piano Quintet 
1966 Five Pieces for piano 
1967 Five Pieces for Orchestra (transcription of 'Five pieces for piano') 
1967 Three Shakespeare Songs 
1967 Four Pieces for oboe d'amore, strings and harp (orch. ver. of 1965) 
1968 Three Pieces for cello and piano 
1969 Three Songs from Childhood for mezzo and violin 
1969 Violin Sonata (unaccompanied) 
1970 Suite No. 2 – Four dances from Electra for 2 pf and perc. 
1970 Aubade for clarinet and pf or orchestra 
1971 Suite No. 3 for two pianos 
1971 Six Studies for string orchestra 
1971 Auckland '71 – Ode for male speaker, chorus and orch. 
1969 1972 – Nastasya – 3-act opera, based on Dostoievsky's The Idiot 
1973 Six Songs – Out of Dark for mezzo and piano or orchestra 
1973 Four Short Concert Studies for piano 
1974 Three Love Songs for soprano & piano – poems by Fairburn 
1974 Seven Medieval Lyrics for SATB, orchestra, or piano duet 
1974 The Twelve Signs for wind, brass piano, harp and perc. 
1975 Piano Sonata No. 2 in one movement 
1975 Five Bagatelles for piano 
1977 Sonatina for piano 
1977 Five Songs to Poems by Wolkskehl – baritone & piano or orchestra 
1977 Sonata for violin and piano 
1978 Sinfonietta for small orchestra (Used for 'Primavera' ballet) 
1978 String Quartet No. 2 
1978 Seven Elizabethan Lyrics for chorus and piano duet or orchestra 
1979 Te Tau (The Seasons) – Winter & Spring for solo piano; Summer and Autumn for piano duet 
1979 An Easter Cantata for soprano, chorus and organ or string orch. 
1981 Symphony No. 1 
1983 Symphony No. 2 
1983 Trio for horn, violin and piano 
1985 Pacific Festival Overture 
1985 Promenade ballet suite for orch. or piano duet 
1985 The Mayors New Coat – ballet for orchestra 
1985 Piano Sonata No. 3 
1985 Piano Concerto No. 2 
1985 Film Music for Nicholas Nickleby
1986 Song of Solomon symphonic cantata 
1987 Symphony No. 3 
1988 Poems for piano and orchestra 
1989 The Four Elements for four mandolins 
1989 The Four Elements for orch. or two pianos (transcriptions) 
1989 Suite No. 4 for two pianos ('Four Elements' transcription) 
1989 Quartet for oboe and clarinet, bassoon and piano 
1989 Octet for wind 
1990 Gaudeamus Overture 
1990 Taupo – The Eye of the World for soprano, choir & orch. 
1990 Prelude and Aria for Oboe d'Amore (dedicated to Jennifer Paull)
1991 Foxtrot from Coup De Folie – piano duet or piano solo 
1991 Symphony No. 4 
1991 Four pieces for oboe d'amore and piano 
1991 Two Mansfield poems for Oboe d'Amore (dedicated to Jennifer Paull)
1991 Six choral Pieces from text by Katherine Mansfield 
1992 Eleven Pleasant Pieces for piano 
1992 Lord Arthur Savile's Crime – Opera in One Act 
1992 Six Variations on a Theme by Beethoven for piano 
1994 Sonata for two pianos 
1995 Arikinui – cantata for soprano and orchestra 
1995 Violin concerto 
1996 The Maze of the Muses – Chamber Opera 
1996 The End of the Golden Weather for orchestra 
1996 Ten Concert Studies for piano – Book I 
1996 Doves of Peace for piano 
1996 Waiheke Island, A Suite for Oboe Consort (dedicated to Jennifer Paull)
1997 Outcast from Paradise 
1997 Ngataringa Nocturne and Scherzo for oboe, oboe d'amore, and piano (dedicated to Jennifer Paull)
1997 Sonatina di Maggio for musette (oboe) (dedicated to Jennifer Paull)
1998 in the Rangitaki Valley for two pianos, eight hands 
1998 Coup De Folie for two pianos, eight hands 
1998 Eve des Eaux – Eight French songs for solo tenor 
1998 Revelations for piano 
1999 'Akaraua' – Four symphonic sketches for orchestra 
1999 Three pieces for solo bassoon 
1999 El Tango for orchestra 
1999 Ten Concert studies for piano, Book 2 
1999 Trio for violin, cello and piano 
1999 Wind trio for flute, oboe and bassoon 
1999 Mardi Gras 2000, new version 
2000 Three pieces for oboe and organ 
2000 Elegie for oboe and piano 
2000 Petit Concert, pour trio a vent: flute, hautbois et basson 
2001 Seven Waiheke Lyrics, SATB and piano duet 
2001 Three Pieces for the oboe and organ 
2001 Fanfare for Otago University 
2001 Concerto Balabile
2002 Oboe Concerto (dedicated to Dominique Enon)

Books
 A Life Set to Music (autobiography)

References

External links
 
 Biography on Centre for New Zealand Music site
 Biography on the Australian Music Center site 
 Death of the composer
 composer works
 Edwin Carr Foundation Scholarship
 Edwin Carr by Amoris

1926 births
2003 deaths
20th-century classical composers
People educated at Otago Boys' High School
University of Otago alumni
Members of the New Zealand Order of Merit
New Zealand classical composers
Male classical composers
People from Waiheke Island
Academic staff of the Sydney Conservatorium of Music
20th-century male musicians